Fred Chicago Chamber Music is a double album by American jazz saxophonist Fred Anderson recorded in 1996 and released on the Chicago-based Southport label. The first disc matches him in a trio with bassist Tatsu Aoki and drummer Afifi Phillard, while the second is composed of Anderson/Aoki duets with Southport co-owner Bradley Parker-Sparrow joining in on piano for two tracks.

Reception

In his review for AllMusic, Scott Yanow states "All of the numbers are group improvisations, but the results are far from random or chaotic. Anderson is not afraid to embrace a melody, or to play quite tonally and use repetition, space and rhythmic ideas."

The Penguin Guide to Jazz notes that "Fred sometimes overplays to cover for the absence of a chordal instrument, he doesn't always seem entirely secure with his drummer, a relative unknown, and tries to pack the metre."

The JazzTimes review by Willard Jenkins states "Befitting Anderson's spontaneous expressions, the pieces here are credited to the collective whole. As for the state of the tenor, Fred Anderson is an original who is not to be missed.."

Track listing
Disc One
All compositions by Anderson / Aoki / Philliard
 "Fred's Blues" - 11:53
 "Grasshopper Greens" - 6:24
 "Indiana" - 16:51
 "Grizzle" - 20:44
 "Afro-Asia" - 14:37
Disc Two
All compositions by Anderson / Aoki / Sparrow
 "Twice as Good" - 6:41
 "Reward" - 9:26
 "Instantaneous Hot Water Heater" - 7:17
 "Sand" - 6:15
 "Bi-Pack" - 6:13
 "Rusty Swing" - 6:12
 "Ring: Duet Version" - 7:05
 "North Avenue" - 8:22
 "Steady Things Are..." - 6:21
 "Ice Bucket" - 2:41

Personnel
Fred Anderson - tenor sax
Tatsu Aoki - bass
Afifi Phillard - drums, percussion on disc one
Bradley Parker-Sparrow - piano on disc two #8, #10

References

1997 albums
Fred Anderson (musician) albums